Rudy Carlier (born 19 January 1986 in Saint-Quentin, Aisne) is a French footballer who plays for SC Schiltigheim as a forward.

External links
 
 
 
 

1986 births
Living people
French footballers
Association football forwards
Ligue 1 players
Ligue 2 players
RC Strasbourg Alsace players
FC Gueugnon players
Clermont Foot players
US Créteil-Lusitanos players
FC Rouen players
Segunda División players
Segunda División B players
Racing de Ferrol footballers
SD Eibar footballers
SV Eintracht Trier 05 players
French expatriate footballers
Expatriate footballers in Spain
SVN Zweibrücken players
People from Saint-Quentin, Aisne
French expatriate sportspeople in Spain
French expatriate sportspeople in Germany
Expatriate footballers in Germany
Footballers from Hauts-de-France
Sportspeople from Aisne